Graham Stanley (27 January 1938 – 14 January 1997) was a footballer who played as a wing half in the Football League for Bolton Wanderers, Tranmere Rovers and Runcorn.

References

1938 births
1997 deaths
Bolton Wanderers F.C. players
Tranmere Rovers F.C. players
Runcorn F.C. Halton players
Association football wing halves
English footballers
English Football League players
People from Rotherham